The Birds and the Bees is split EP between Australian bands Trial Kennedy and Horsell Common, released 4 April 2006. It features three songs by each band, one of them being an acoustic cover of one of the other band's songs.

Track listing
Tracks 1, 2 and 5 are recorded by Horsell Common, tracks 3, 4 and 6 are recorded by Trial Kennedy.
Track 5 is Horsell Common's cover of "Knife Light" by Trial Kennedy.
Track 6 is Trial Kennedy's cover of "The Disaster" by Horsell Common.

 "Everlasting" - 3:00
 "Milk Was a Bad Choice" - 3:38
 "Sonic Affair" - 4:26
 "My Idol Who?" - 3:39
 "Knife Light (acoustic)" - 3:14
 "The Disaster (acoustic)" -  3:07

Personnel

Horsell Common -
Mark Stewart - Vocals, Guitar
Luke Cripps - Bass Guitar
Leigh Pengelly - Drums

Trial Kennedy -
Tim Morrison - Lead Vocals
Stacey Gray - Guitar, Vocals
Aaron Malcolmson - Bass Guitar
Shaun Gionis - Drums

References

Horsell Common albums
Trial Kennedy albums
Split EPs
2006 EPs